The 2018–19 Cypriot Cup was the 77th edition of the Cypriot Cup. A total of 24 clubs were accepted to enter the competition. It began on 5 December 2018 with the first round and concluded on 22 May 2019 with the final held at GSP Stadium. The winner of the Cup was AEL Limassol for seventh time and qualified for the 2019–20 Europa League second qualifying round.

First round
The first round draw took place on 5 December 2018 and the matches were played on 5 December 2018.

Second round
The second round draw took place on 21 December 2017.

The following eight teams advanced directly to second round and will meet the eight winners of the first round ties:
AEK Larnaca (2017–18 Cypriot Cup winner)
Apollon Limassol (2017–18 Cypriot Cup runners-up)
ASIL Lysi (via draw)
Doxa Katokopias (via draw)
THOI Lakatamia (via draw)
Ermis Aradippou (via draw)
Ethnikos Achna (via draw)
Karmiotissa (via draw)

|}

First leg

Second leg

Quarter-finals
The quarter-finals draw took place on 4 February 2019 and the matches were played on 20, 27 February and 6 March 2019.

|}

First leg

Second leg

Semi finals
The semi-finals draw took place on 8 March 2019 and the matches will be played on 3 and 17 April 2019.

|}

First Leg

Second Leg

Final

See also	
 2018–19 Cypriot First Division	
 2018–19 Cypriot Second Division

References

	

Cup
Cyprus
Cypriot Cup seasons